FA Youth Cup Finals between 2010 and 2019.

2009–10: Chelsea vs Aston Villa (1–1 and 2–1, 3–2 aggregate)

First leg

Second leg

2010–11: Manchester United vs Sheffield United (2–2 and 4–1, 6–3 aggregate)

First leg

 

 

 (c)
 
 
 
 

 
 

 
(c)

Second leg

 
(c) 

 
 

 
 
 

 
 

 

 

 (c)

2011–12: Chelsea vs Blackburn Rovers (4–0 and 0–1, 4–1 aggregate)

First leg

 

 (c)
 
 
 

 
 
 

 

 
 
 
(c)

Second leg

 
(c) 
 

   
 

 

 
 

 
 
 
 
 (c)

2012–13: Norwich City vs Chelsea (1–0 and 3–2, 4–2 aggregate)

First leg

 
 (c) 
 
 
 
 
 
 
 

 

 

 
 
 
 
 (c)

Second leg

 
 
 
 
 (c) 
 

 

 
 
 
 

 
 (c)

2013–14: Chelsea vs Fulham (2–3 and 5–3, 7–6 aggregate)

First leg

 
 (c) 
 
 
 
 
 
 
 
|-
|colspan=4|Substitutes:
|-

 
 
 
 
|-
|colspan=4|Coach:  Steve Wigley
|-

 
 
 
 
 
 
 (c) 
 
 

|-
|colspan=4|Substitutes:
|-
 
 
 
 
 
|-
|colspan=4|Coach:  Adi Viveash
|-

Second leg

 
  
 
 
 
 
 
 
 
|-
|colspan=4|Substitutes:
|-
 
 
 
 
 
|-
|colspan=4|Coach:  Adi Viveash
|-

 
 
 (c) 
 
 
 
 
 
 
 
|-
|colspan=4|Substitutes:
|-

 
 
 
 
|-
|colspan=4|Coach:  Steve Wigley
|-

2014–15: Chelsea vs Manchester City (3–1 and 2–1, 5–2 aggregate)

First leg

 
  
 
 
 
 
 
 
 
|-
|colspan=4|Substitutes:
|-
 
 
 
 
 
|-
|colspan=4|Coach:  Jason Wilcox
|-

 
 
 
  
 
 
  
 
|-
|colspan=4|Substitutes:
|-
 
 
 
 
 
|-
|colspan=4|Coach:  Joe Edwards
|-

Second leg

 
 
 
  
 
 
 
 
|-
|colspan=4|Substitutes:
|-
 
 
 
 

|-
|colspan=4|Coach:  Joe Edwards
|-

 
  
 
 
 
 
 
 
 
|-
|colspan=4|Substitutes:
|-
 
 
 
 
 
|-
|colspan=4|Coach:  Jason Wilcox
|-

2015–16: Chelsea vs Manchester City (1–1 and 3–1, 4–2 aggregate)

First leg

 
  
 
 
 
 
 
 
 
|-
|colspan=4|Substitutes:
|-
 
 
 
 
 
|-
|colspan=4|Coach:  Jason Wilcox
|-

 

 
 
 
 
 
 
 
 
|-
|colspan=4|Substitutes:
|-
 
 
 
 
 
|-
|colspan=4|Coach:  Joe Edwards
|-

Second leg

 

 
 
 
 
 
 
 
 
|-
|colspan=4|Substitutes:
|-
 
 
 
 
 
|-
|colspan=4|Coach:  Joe Edwards
|-

 
  
 
 
 
 
 
 
 
|-
|colspan=4|Substitutes:
|-
 
 
 
 
 
|-
|colspan=4|Coach:  Jason Wilcox
|-

2016–17: Chelsea vs Manchester City (1–1 and 5–1, 6–2 aggregate)

First leg

 
  
 
 
 
 
 
 
 

|-
|colspan=4|Substitutes:
|-
 
 
 
 
 
|-
|colspan=4|Coach:  Lee Carsley
|-

 

 
 
 
 
 
 
 
 
|-
|colspan=4|Substitutes:
|-

 
 
 
|-
|colspan=4|Coach:  Jody Morris
|-

Second leg

 
 
 
 
 
 
 
 
|-
|colspan=4|Substitutes:
|-
 
 
 
 
 
|-
|colspan=4|Coach:  Jody Morris
|-

 
  
 
 
 
 
 
 
 

|-
|colspan=4|Substitutes:
|-
 
 
 
 
 
|-
|colspan=4|Coach:  Lee Carsley
|-

2017–18: Chelsea vs Arsenal (3–1 and 4–0, 7–1 aggregate)

First leg

 

 
 
 
 
 
 
 
 
|-
|colspan=4|Substitutes:
|-
 
 
 
 
 
|-
|colspan=4|Coach:  Jody Morris
|-

 
  
 
 
 
 
 
 
 
|-
|colspan=4|Substitutes:
|-
 
 
 
 
 
|-
|colspan=4|Coach:  Kwame Ampadu
|-

Second leg

 
  
 
 
 
 
 
 
 
|-
|colspan=4|Substitutes:
|-
 
 
 
 
 
|-
|colspan=4|Coach:  Kwame Ampadu
|-

 
 

 

 
 
 
 
|-
|colspan=4|Substitutes:
|-

 
 
  
 
|-
|colspan=4|Coach:  Jody Morris
|-

2018–19: Manchester City 1–1 Liverpool (3–5 on pens)

 
  
 
 
 
 
 
 
 
|-
|colspan=4|Substitutes:
|-
 
 
 
 
 
|-
|colspan=4|Coach:  Gareth Taylor
|-

 
 

 

 
 

 
|-
|colspan=4|Substitutes:
|-
 
 
 
  
 
|-
|colspan=4|Coach:  Barry Lewtas
|-

References

External links
The FA Youth Cup at The Football Association official website

 
Finals